In Greek mythology King Eurytus (Ancient Greek: Εὔρυτος) of Oechalia (Oikhalíā), Thessaly, was a skillful archer who even said to have instructed Heracles in his art of using the bow.

Family 
Eurytus was the son of Melaneus either by Stratonice, daughter of King Porthaon of Calydon and Laothoe or by the eponymous heroine Oechalia. He was the brother of Ambracias, eponym of Ambracia, a city in Epirus.

Eurytus married Antiope, daughter of Pylon (son of Naubolus) and had these children: Iphitus, Clytius, Toxeus, Deioneus, Molion, Didaeon, Hippasus and a very beautiful daughter, Iole. A late legend also attributes Eurytus as the father of Dryope, by his first wife. Hesiod calls his wife Antioche and they had four sons but Creophylus says only two.

Eurytus' grandfather was Apollo, the archer-god, and was also a famed archer. Eurytus has been noted by some as the one who taught Heracles the art of archery.

Mythology

Contest with a god 
According to Homer, Eurytus became so proud of his archery skills that he challenged Apollo. The god killed Eurytus for his presumption, and Eurytus' bow was passed to Iphitus, who later gave the bow to his friend Odysseus. It was this bow that Odysseus used to kill the suitors who had wanted to take his wife, Penelope.

Sacking of Oechalia 
A more familiar version of Eurytus' death involves a feud with Heracles. Eurytus promised the hand of his daughter Iole as a prize to whoever could defeat him and his sons in an archery contest. Heracles won the archery contest, but Eurytus and his sons (except Iphitus) reneged on the promise and refused to give up lole, fearing that Heracles would go mad and kill any children he had with Iole, just as he had slain the children whom he had had with Megara.

Heracles left in anger, and soon after twelve of Eurytus' mares were stolen. Some have written that Heracles stole the mares himself, while others have said that Autolycus stole the mares and sold them to Heracles. In the search for the mares, Iphitus, who was convinced of Heracles's innocence, invited Heracles to help and stayed as Heracles's guest at Tiryns. Heracles invited Iphitus to the top of the palace walls and, in a fit of anger, threw Iphitus to his death. For this crime, Heracles was forced to serve the Lydian queen Omphale as a slave for either one or three years.

After Heracles had married Deianeira, he returned to Oechalia with an army. Revenge-driven, Heracles sacked the city and killed Eurytus and his sons, then took Iole as his concubine. According to a tradition in Athenaeus, the hero put them to death because they had demanded a tribute from the Euboeans.

The remains of the body of Eurytus were believed to be preserved in the Carnasian grove; and in the Messenian Oechalia sacrifices were offered to him every year.

Notes

References 
 Athenaeus of Naucratis, The Deipnosophists or Banquet of the Learned. London. Henry G. Bohn, York Street, Covent Garden. 1854. Online version at the Perseus Digital Library.
 Athenaeus of Naucratis, Deipnosophistae. Kaibel. In Aedibus B.G. Teubneri. Lipsiae. 1887. Greek text available at the Perseus Digital Library.
 Homer, The Odyssey with an English Translation by A.T. Murray, PH.D. in two volumes. Cambridge, MA., Harvard University Press; London, William Heinemann, Ltd. 1919. Online version at the Perseus Digital Library. Greek text available from the same website.
 March, J., Cassell's Dictionary Of Classical Mythology, London, 1999. 
 
 Pausanias, Description of Greece with an English Translation by W.H.S. Jones, Litt.D., and H.A. Ormerod, M.A., in 4 Volumes. Cambridge, MA, Harvard University Press; London, William Heinemann Ltd. 1918. Online version at the Perseus Digital Library
 Pausanias, Graeciae Descriptio. 3 vols. Leipzig, Teubner. 1903.  Greek text available at the Perseus Digital Library.
 Pseudo-Apollodorus, The Library with an English Translation by Sir James George Frazer, F.B.A., F.R.S. in 2 Volumes, Cambridge, MA, Harvard University Press; London, William Heinemann Ltd. 1921. Online version at the Perseus Digital Library. Greek text available from the same website.
 Publius Ovidius Naso, Metamorphoses translated by Brookes More (1859-1942). Boston, Cornhill Publishing Co. 1922. Online version at the Perseus Digital Library.
 Publius Ovidius Naso, Metamorphoses. Hugo Magnus. Gotha (Germany). Friedr. Andr. Perthes. 1892. Latin text available at the Perseus Digital Library.
 Theocritus, Idylls from The Greek Bucolic Poets translated by Edmonds, J M. Loeb Classical Library Volume 28. Cambridge, MA. Harvard University Press. 1912. Online version at theoi.com
 Theocritus, Idylls edited by R. J. Cholmeley, M.A. London. George Bell & Sons. 1901. Greek text available at the Perseus Digital Library.

External links

Mythological kings of Thessaly
Kings in Greek mythology
Metamorphoses characters
Deeds of Apollo
Mythology of Heracles
Mythological Greek archers